Abdelwahab Abdallah (born 14 February 1940) is a Tunisian politician and diplomat who served as the Minister of Foreign Affairs of Tunisia and was advisor to the President.

Early life
Abdallah was born in Monastir, Tunisia on 14 February 1940.

Career
Before Zine El Abidine Ben Ali was elected the president in 1987, Abdallah was the Minister of Information of Tunisia under Habib Bourguiba. Abdallah was in office until 1988. From 1988 to 1990 he served as the Ambassador of Tunisia to Great Britain. As a member of Constitutional Democratic Rally, he was a close aid to the president of Tunisia since 1990 on economic issues. and led several Tunisian press agencies. He became foreign minister in a cabinet reshuffle on 17 August 2005. His successor, Kamel Morjane was appointed Foreign Minister of Tunisia by President Ben Ali on 14 January 2010.

Following Tunisian protests in 2010-2011, he was removed from his post on 13 January 2011. Abdallah was subsequently put under house arrest on 24 January 2011 while the investigations are ongoing.

Personal life
Abdallah's wife, Alya Abdallah, was appointed president of Banque de Tunisie (BT) in April 2008.

References

1940 births
Living people
Government ministers of Tunisia
Ambassadors of Tunisia to the United Kingdom
Foreign ministers of Tunisia